List of rivers in Paraná (Brazilian State).

The list is arranged by drainage basin from north to south, with respective tributaries indented under each larger stream's name and ordered from downstream to upstream. All rivers in Paraná drain to the Atlantic Ocean, primarily via the Paraná River.

By Drainage Basin

Atlantic Coast 

 Ribeira de Iguape River 
 Pardo River
 São João Surrá River
 Uberaba River
 Puturã River
 Capivari River
 São Sebastião River
 Grande River
 Do Rocha River
 Itapirapuã River
 Turvo River
 Ponta Grossa River
 Piedade River
 Sant'Ana River
 Açunguí River
 Tacaniça River
 Guaraqueçaba River
 Serra Negra River
 Cachoeira River
 Cubatão River
 São João River
 Cubatãozinho River

Paraná Basin 

 Paraná River
 Iguazu River
 São João River
 Belo River
 Represa Grande River
 Santo Antônio River
 Benjamim Constant River
 Floriano River
 Siemens River
 Gonçalves Dias River
 Capanema River
 Andrade River
 Cotegipe River
 Tormenta River
 Adelaide River
 Jaracatiá River
 Canoas River
 Guarani River
 Chopim River
 Santana River
 Marrecas River
 Lonqueador River
 Vitorino River
 Forquilha River
 Jacutinga River
 Pato Branco River
 Do Banho River
 Das Lontras River
 Bandeira River
 Das Cobras River
 Capivara River
 Cavernoso River
 Tapera River
 Araras River
 Jordão River
 Capão Grande River
 Caracu River
 Pinhão River
 São Jerônimo River
 Campo Real River
 Coitinho River
 Das Marrecas River
 Butiá River
 Iratim River
 Dos Patos River
 São Lourenço River
 Da Areia River
 Pimpão River
 Sant'Ana River
 Jararaca River
 Iratinzinho River
 Palmital River
 Jangada River
 Faria River
 Vermelho River
 Da Várzea River
 Claro River
 Potinga River
 Poço Bonito River
 Cachoeira River
 Preto River
 Negro River
 Da Várzea River
 Passa Três River
 Água Branca River
 Água Amarela River
 Passa Dois River
 Dos Papagaios River
 Passa Una River
 Maurício River
 Miringuava River
 Belém River
 Piraquara River
 Ocoi River
 São Francisco Falso Braço Sul River
 São Francisco Falso Braço Norte River
 Santa Quitéria River
 São Francisco River
 Arroio Guaçu River
 Tatuí River
 Piquiri River
 Iporã River
 Xambre River
 Açu River
 Jangada River
 Azul River
 Jacaré River
 Encantado River
 Verde River
 Dos Jesuítas River
 Goioerê River
 Da Areia River
 Barreiro River
 Carajá River
 Melissa River
 Sapucaí River (Reboucas River)
 Goio-Bang River
 Mamboré River
 Tricolor River
 Tourinho River
 Cantú River
 Caratuva River
 Água Quente River
 Macacos River
 Mato Rico River
 Da Prata River
 Barbaquá River
 Feio River
 Laranjal River
 Bandeira River
 Do Cobre River
 Cinco Voltas River
 São João River
 Paracaí River
 Itaúna River
 Do Veado River
 Ivaí River
 Tapiracuí River
 Capricórnio River
 Dos Indios River
 Ligeiro River
 Claro River
 Pinguim River
 Aquidabã River
 Mourão River
 Araras River
 Bugre River
 Corumbataí River
 Chupador River
 Formoso River
 Laranjeiras River
 Muguilhão River
 Vorá River
 Bulha River
 Bom River
 Das Antas River
 Três Barras River
 Barra Nova River
 Alonzo River
 São Pedro River
 Bonito River
 Da Faca River
 Branco River
 Azul River
 Ubazinho River
 Borboleta River
 Pitanga River
 Bonito River
 Belo River
 Marrecas River
 São Francisco River
 Ivaizinho River
 Barra Grande River
 Dos Indios River
 Dos Patos River
 São João River
 Boa Vista River
 Lajeado River
 Paranapanema River
 Corvo River
 Do Quati River
 Caiuá River
 Pirapó River
 Bandeirantes do Norte River
 Vermelho River
 Tibagi River
 Congonhas River
 Três Bôcas River
 Cambé River
 Taquara River
 São Jerônimo River
 Apucaraninha River
 Claro River
 Apucarama River
 Das Antas River
 Barra Grande River
 Alegre River
 Harmonia River
 Imbaú River
 Iapó River
 Fortaleza River
 Piraí-Mirim River
 Piraí River
 Cunhaporanga River
 Pitangui River
 São João River
 Jutuva River
 Bitumirim River
 Ipiranga River
 Imbituva River
 Ribeira River
 Perdido River
 Guaraúna River
 Guarauninha River
 Do Salto River
 Das Cinzas River
 Laranjinha River
 Jacaré River (Jacarezinho River)
 Do Meio River
 Itararé River
 Da Fartura River
 Da Pescaria River
 Jaguariaíva River
 Jaguariatu River
 Da Água Morta River

Alphabetically 

 Açu River
 Açunguí River
 Adelaide River
 Água Amarela River
 Água Branca River
 Da Água Morta River
 Água Quente River
 Alegre River
 Alonzo River
 Andrade River
 Das Antas River
 Das Antas River
 Apucarama River
 Apucaraninha River
 Aquidabã River
 Araras River
 Araras River
 Da Areia River
 Da Areia River
 Arroio Guaçu River
 Azul River
 Azul River
 Bandeira River
 Bandeira River
 Bandeirantes do Norte River
 Do Banho River
 Barbaquá River
 Barra Grande River
 Barra Grande River
 Barra Nova River
 Barreiro River
 Belém River
 Belo River
 Belo River
 Benjamim Constant River
 Bitumirim River
 Boa Vista River
 Bom River
 Bonito River
 Bonito River
 Borboleta River
 Branco River
 Bugre River
 Bulha River
 Butiá River
 Cachoeira River
 Cachoeira River
 Caiuá River
 Cambé River
 Campo Real River
 Canoas River
 Cantú River
 Capanema River
 Capão Grande River
 Capivara River
 Capivari River
 Capricórnio River
 Caracu River
 Carajá River
 Caratuva River
 Cavernoso River
 Chopim River
 Chupador River
 Cinco Voltas River
 Das Cinzas River
 Claro River
 Claro River
 Claro River
 Das Cobras River
 Do Cobre River
 Coitinho River
 Congonhas River
 Corumbataí River
 Corvo River
 Cotegipe River
 Cubatão River
 Cubatãozinho River
 Cunhaporanga River
 Encantado River
 Da Faca River
 Faria River
 Da Fartura River
 Feio River
 Floriano River
 Formoso River
 Forquilha River
 Fortaleza River
 Goio-Bang River
 Goioerê River
 Gonçalves Dias River
 Grande River
 Guarani River
 Guaraqueçaba River
 Guaraúna River
 Guarauninha River
 Iapó River
 Iguazu River
 Imbaú River
 Imbituva River
 Dos Indios River
 Dos Indios River
 Ipiranga River
 Iporã River
 Iratim River
 Iratinzinho River
 Itapirapuã River
 Itararé River
 Itaúna River
 Ivaí River
 Ivaizinho River
 Jacaré River
 Jacaré River (Jacarezinho River)
 Jacutinga River
 Jaguariaíva River
 Jaguariatu River
 Jangada River
 Jangada River
 Jaracatiá River
 Jararaca River
 Dos Jesuítas River
 Jordão River
 Jutuva River
 Lajeado River
 Laranjal River
 Laranjeiras River
 Laranjinha River
 Ligeiro River
 Lonqueador River
 Das Lontras River
 Macacos River
 Mamboré River
 Marrecas River
 Marrecas River
 Das Marrecas River
 Mato Rico River
 Maurício River
 Do Meio River
 Melissa River
 Miringuava River
 Mourão River
 Muguilhão River
 Negro River
 Ocoi River
 Palmital River
 Dos Papagaios River
 Paracaí River
 Paraná River
 Paranapanema River
 Pardo River
 Passa Dois River
 Passa Três River
 Passa Una River
 Pato Branco River
 Dos Patos River
 Dos Patos River
 Perdido River
 Da Pescaria River
 Piedade River
 Pimpão River
 Pinguim River
 Pinhão River
 Piquiri River
 Piraí River
 Piraí-Mirim River
 Pirapó River
 Piraquara River
 Pitanga River
 Pitangui River
 Poço Bonito River
 Ponta Grossa River
 Potinga River
 Da Prata River
 Preto River
 Puturã River
 Do Quati River
 Represa Grande River
 Ribeira River
 Ribeira River
 Do Rocha River
 Do Salto River
 Santana River
 Sant'Ana River
 Sant'Ana River
 Santa Quitéria River
 Santo Antônio River
 São Francisco River
 São Francisco River
 São Francisco Falso Braço Norte River
 São Francisco Falso Braço Sul River
 São Jerônimo River
 São Jerônimo River
 São João River
 São João River
 São João River
 São João River
 São João River
 São João Surrá River
 São Lourenço River
 São Pedro River
 São Sebastião River
 Sapucaí River (Reboucas River)
 Serra Negra River
 Siemens River
 Tacaniça River
 Tapera River
 Tapiracuí River
 Taquara River
 Tatuí River
 Tibagi River
 Tormenta River
 Tourinho River
 Três Barras River
 Três Bôcas River
 Tricolor River
 Turvo River
 Ubazinho River
 Uberaba River
 Da Várzea River
 Da Várzea River
 Do Veado River
 Verde River
 Vermelho River
 Vermelho River
 Vitorino River
 Vorá River
 Xambrê River

References
 Map from Ministry of Transport
 Rand McNally, The New International Atlas, 1993.
  GEOnet Names Server

 
Parana
Environment of Paraná (state)